Helen Johnson Doyle Sioussat (February 11, 1902 - December 2, 1995) was a network executive in the early days of American television, serving as CBS radio's director of talks and public affairs from 1937 to 1958. She created, and was the host of, the first roundtable discussion program on television.

Early years 
The daughter of Maurice Joseph Talleyrand Sioussat, she was born in Baltimore and was raised by her aunt after her mother's death when Sioussat was seven years old. She graduated from Western High School and Goucher College and then worked in a variety of business roles, including being a secretary, a dental assistant, a business manager, and an assistant to a treasurer. She also was a professional dancer for a year.

Broadcasting career 
Sioussat entered broadcasting as an assistant to Phillips Lord, a producer of radio programs. One of approximately 200 applicants, she admitted that she did not like radio, knew nothing about the medium, and did not own a radio receiver. She balked at Lord's initial salary offer of $50 per week, saying that she wanted more "because it's going to be much harder for me to do it than one of these other people." By the time she reached her home, Lord was calling with an offer of $65 per week. She initially managed Lord's Washington office, gathering official information for his G-Men program. After that program was canceled, she was transferred to New York and was put in charge of all of the Lord programs, which included Gang Busters, Mr. District Attorney, and Seth Parker. In addition to her other duties, she selected members of casts, directed rehearsals, and wrote and revised scripts.

In 1936, Edward R. Murrow, director of talks at CBS hired Sioussat to be his assistant. The following year, she replaced Murrow when he left that post to go to London. After a simultaneous realignment of duties at the network, she became responsible for all CBS non-commercial public affairs programs. Sioussat helped to formulate policies under the new setup, including fairness in granting air time to those who sought it. Her duties also included editing Talks, a quarterly digest published by CBS. Acceptance did not come easily in the male-dominated atmosphere that existed then. A vice president refused to authorize letterhead and business cards showing her as department head until the CBS legal department overruled him. When a male assistant was hired, he began the job at a higher salary than hers. She received raises later, but that initial discrepancy rankled her.

Table Talk with Helen Sioussat was "the first question-and-answer discussion program on CBS." It was broadcast from a CBS-TV studio in Grand Central Station in 1941-1943 on experimental station W2XAB, and its format worked well enough that it was essentially copied in later talk programs.

Other professional activities 
Sioussat was a co-founder of American Women in Radio and Television, an organization to support female workers in media. She also wrote the book Mikes Don't Bite and wrote both the music and the lyrics for four songs.

Personal life 
Sioussat was married twice and divorced twice by 1934. A feature article in The Baltimore Sun in 1953 described her as "an Elsa Maxwell type party-giver and party-goer".

Papers 
Helen Sioussat papers are housed in the Library of American Broadcasting at the University of Maryland libraries. Donated in 1995, the collection includes citations, correspondence, financial records, manuscripts, photographs, press releases, transcripts, and other items.

References 

 

1902 births
1995 deaths
CBS executives
Women television executives
Goucher College alumni
20th-century American women writers
American female dancers